The Most Fabulous Story Ever Told is a metaphysical/existentialist comedy written in 1998 by Paul Rudnick.

Plot

Original Production 
The play was originally produced at the Williamstown Theatre Festival on the Nikos Stage, opening on July 1, 1998. The show was directed by Christopher Ashley, set design Michael Brown, costume design Marion Williams, lighting design Rui Rita, and sound design Kurt B. Kellenberger. The cast starred Dara Fisher (Stage Manager), Alan Tudyk (Adam), Bobby Cannavale (Steve), Maggie Moore (Matinee Lady, et al.), Michael Wiggins (Priest, et al.), Peter Bartlett (Latecomer, et al.), Michi Barall (Cheryl Mindle, et al.), Becky Ann Baker (Jane), and Jessica Hecht (Mabel).

The play would transfer to the New York Theatre Workshop, with Ashley directing, set design Brown, costume design Susan Hilferty, lighting design Donald Holder, and sound design Darron L. West. The cast starred Tudyk (Adam), Bartlett (Latecomer, et al.), Baker (Jane), Amy Sedaris (Stage Manager), Juan Carlos Hernandez (Steve), Orlando Pabotoy (Father Joseph, et al.), Lisa Kron (Miriam Miller et al.), Joanna P. Adler (Cheryl Mindel et al.), and Kathryn Meisle (Mabel). Jenny Bacon was playing Mabel, but broke her foot a few days before opening, and was replaced by Meisle.

After that, the production transferred to the Minetta Lane Theatre, the only changes to the cast was Peg Healey (Stage Manager) and Jay Goede (Steve).

Reviews
Ben Brantley of the New York Times said, "there's reverence in Mr. Rudnick's irreverence, an earnest warmth beneath the frivolity" and "Line by line, Mr. Rudnick may be the funniest writer for the stage in the United States today...".

Controversy
The show's content, not only rewriting the Bible, but also having Adam be homosexual, has caused numerous protests when the show is scheduled to open. Rudnick stated about detractors, "tell them I spoke to God personally and he said they're wrong." The 2002 production at the University of California, Santa Cruz, Jerry Falwell and Margie Phelps of the Westboro Baptist Church protested the production, with Phelps stating ""this fiasco at UC Santa Cruz is just one more symptom of the deadly disease encompassing this land. We have institutionalized sin and we're going to face the consequences. Soon" In 2013, Oklahoma state representative Dan Fisher claimed it was a "direct frontal attack" to Christians. The same year, in Dallas, America Needs Fatima protested another production. In 2017, America Needs Fatima also protested a production in Atlanta.

References

External links
 

1998 plays
HIV/AIDS in theatre
Off-Broadway plays
1990s LGBT literature
LGBT-related plays
LGBT-related controversies in plays
Plays based on the Bible
Plays set in New York City